Foelallt is a small village in the  community of Ciliau Aeron, Ceredigion, Wales, which is 66.2 miles (106.6 km) from Cardiff and 180.2 miles (290 km) from London. Foelallt is represented in the Senedd by Elin Jones (Plaid Cymru) and is part of the Ceredigion constituency in the House of Commons.

References

See also
List of localities in Wales by population

Villages in Ceredigion